John Joseph Adams (September 16, 1848 – February 16, 1919) was an American politician and a United States Congressman from New York State, serving two terms from 1883 to 1887.

Biography
Adams was born in Douglas Town in the New Brunswick colony in British Canada (now part of Miramichi) on September 16, 1848. He emigrated to the United States in 1864, settling in New York City, and worked in a dry-goods firm in New York City until he began studies at Columbia Law School. Adams graduated with a degree in law in 1876 and was admitted to the bar the same year.  In addition, he was involved in several businesses, including the Adams Mining Company of Leadville, Colorado, which included his brothers Michael Adams (1845-1899), a member of the Canadian Parliament, and Samuel Adams (1846-1928), a member of the Colorado State Senate.

Congress 
Elected to the United States House of Representatives from two different districts, Adams represented the 8th District in the forty-eighth United States Congress from March 4, 1883 to March 3, 1885. He then represented the 7th district in the Fiftieth United States Congress from March 4, 1885 to March 3, 1887.  Both districts at the time were in Queens. He did not seek renomination in 1886 and returned to the practice of law.

Death
In 1918, Adams suffered a stroke.  He died of heart disease at The Ansonia Hotel in Manhattan on February 16, 1919. He is interred at Green-Wood Cemetery, Brooklyn, New York.

References

External links

1848 births
1919 deaths
People from Miramichi, New Brunswick
Pre-Confederation Canadian emigrants to the United States
Democratic Party members of the United States House of Representatives from New York (state)
19th-century American politicians
Columbia Law School alumni
Burials at Green-Wood Cemetery